Best of Live is a compilation album by the free jazz group Last Exit, it was released in 1990 by Enemy Records.

Track listing

Personnel 
Last Exit
Peter Brötzmann – baritone saxophone, tenor saxophone, tárogató
Ronald Shannon Jackson – drums, voice
Bill Laswell – Fender 6-string bass
Sonny Sharrock – guitar
Additional musicians
Herbie Hancock – piano (7)
Technical personnel
Last Exit – producer

Release history

References 

1987 live albums
Last Exit (free jazz band) albums
Enemy Records compilation albums